Felipe Augusto de Almeida Monteiro (born 16 May 1989), known simply as Felipe or Felipe Monteiro, is a Brazilian professional footballer who plays as a centre back for English club Nottingham Forest.

Felipe began his career with União Mogi and was loaned to Bragantino before joining Corinthians in 2012. He played 109 times for the club, winning honours including the 2012 FIFA Club World Cup and the 2015 Campeonato Brasileiro Série A. In 2016, he joined Porto, where he won a Primeira Liga title in 2018. The following year, he signed for Atlético Madrid, and won La Liga in 2021.

He made his senior international debut for Brazil in 2018, and was part of their squad that came runners-up at the 2021 Copa América.

Club career

Early career
Born in Mogi das Cruzes, São Paulo, Felipe trialled at Sport Club Corinthians Paulista at the age of 14 but was released. He then worked for his mother-in-law, delivering mushrooms to restaurants, while playing for Valtra, a tractor company works team partnered with União Futebol Clube. He turned professional there, and debuted in the Campeonato Paulista Série A2 in 2009. After playing two friendlies against Clube Atlético Bragantino of the Campeonato Brasileiro Série B in 2011, he signed for them on loan. He then won the attention of Corinthians.

Corinthians
With only 88 minutes of football to his name in his first year for Corinthians, he was a surprise inclusion for the squad chosen by manager Tite for the 2012 FIFA Club World Cup in Japan. He was unused as his club won the title against Chelsea.

In the 2015 Campeonato Brasileiro Série A, Felipe played 26 games as Corinthians won the national title. He scored his first goal in the competition on 26 July in a 1–1 draw at Coritiba Foot Ball Club, and on 9 August he was sent off in a game of the same result at city rivals São Paulo FC.

Porto
On 15 June 2016, Felipe moved abroad for the first time, signing a five-year deal at FC Porto. He made his debut on 12 August as they began their season with a 3–1 win at Rio Ave FC. On 23 August, he opened the scoring in a 3–0 win at A.S. Roma in the UEFA Champions League playoff to put Porto into the group stages 4–1 on aggregate, and five days later he scored a first league goal to open a 2–1 loss at rivals Sporting CP.

In 2017–18, Porto won the league and Felipe was one of five club players named in the Team of the Year, alongside his fellow defenders Alex Telles and Ricardo Pereira. On 3 January he headed the winner at  C.D. Feirense (2–1) then was sent off for a second yellow card.

On 2 April 2019, Felipe was sent off in a 1–1 draw at S.C. Braga, though his team advanced to the 2019 Taça de Portugal Final 4–1 on aggregate. Due to his accumulation of yellow cards over the season, he missed the next two league matches. In the final on 25 May at the Estádio Nacional, he scored in added time at the end of extra time to secure a 2–2 draw with Sporting, but the Lisbon team won on penalties.

Atlético Madrid
On 27 May 2019, Felipe signed for Atlético Madrid for a fee of €20 million. The Colchoneros were seeking to boost their defence after the recent losses of Diego Godín, Juanfran and Lucas Hernandez. He scored his first goal for the club in 2–0 UEFA Champions League last matchday win against FC Lokomotiv Moscow on 11 December, qualifying his team to the knockout phase. 

In 25 games for his first domestic season, Felipe scored once to win a 2–1 home game against Levante UD, with all goals scored by the 18th minute. His form dropped as the 2019–20 season concluded after a three-month COVID-19 lockdown, and the following season he fought for a place in the central defence alongside José María Giménez, Stefan Savić and Mario Hermoso, nonetheless being the most played of the four as the team won the league.

In 2021–22, Felipe was sent off three times in all competitions, including twice in the Champions League. In a group game against Liverpool, he was dismissed with a straight red for a foul on Sadio Mané, while in the quarter-finals against another English team Manchester City he got two yellows for fouls on Phil Foden, prompting a melee.

Nottingham Forest
Felipe joined Premier League side Nottingham Forest on deadline day, 31 January 2023.

International career
Felipe was called up to Brazil's squad by coach Dunga for the 2018 FIFA World Cup qualifier against Paraguay in March 2016, to replace the suspended David Luiz. He made his debut for the national team on 11 September 2018, in a 5–0 friendly win against El Salvador at FedExField in the United States. His Porto teammate Éder Militão debuted in the same game. 

Felipe's second game came on 9 October 2020 in a 5–0 rout of Bolivia at his former club ground of Arena Corinthians, as a 71st-minute substitute for Thiago Silva in the first game of 2022 FIFA World Cup qualification. He was included in the squad for the 2021 Copa América on home soil, but left the team, which finished runners-up, due to a right knee sprain.

Personal life
Felipe was naturalised as a Spanish citizen in April 2022, which freed up a space for a non-European Union player at Atlético Madrid.

Career statistics

Club

International

Honours
Corinthians
Campeonato Brasileiro Série A: 2015
Campeonato Paulista: 2013
Recopa Sudamericana: 2013
FIFA Club World Cup: 2012

Porto
Primeira Liga: 2017–18
Supertaça Cândido de Oliveira: 2018

Atletico Madrid
La Liga: 2020–21
Individual
Campeonato Paulista Team of the Year: 2016
SJPF Primeira Liga Team of the Year: 2017
Primeira Liga Team of the Year: 2018

References

External links

Profile at the Nottingham Forest F.C. website

1989 births
Living people
People from Mogi das Cruzes
Footballers from São Paulo (state)
Naturalised citizens of Spain
Spanish people of Brazilian descent
Brazilian footballers
Brazilian expatriate footballers
Association football defenders
Campeonato Brasileiro Série A players
Campeonato Brasileiro Série B players
Primeira Liga players
Premier League players
Clube Atlético Bragantino players
Sport Club Corinthians Paulista players
FC Porto players
Expatriate footballers in Portugal
Atlético Madrid footballers
Brazilian expatriate sportspeople in Portugal
Brazilian expatriate sportspeople in Spain
Brazilian expatriate sportspeople in England
Expatriate footballers in Spain
Expatriate footballers in England
Brazil international footballers
2021 Copa América players
Nottingham Forest F.C. players